Unidentified Suburban Object is a 2016 middle-grade fiction book written by Mike Jung. It was published in May 2016 by Arthur A. Levine Books, an imprint of Scholastic Inc.

Background 
Mike Jung is one of the founders of the We Need Diverse Books movement, which motivated him to delve into his own culture through his writing, particularly in Unidentified Suburban Object. Jung was inspired by his lifetime of watching and reading science fiction stories, as well as comic books. He was also inspired to create strong female characters after the birth of his daughter.

Synopsis 
Despite being the only Korean girl at her school, Chloe Cho is desperate to get in touch with her family roots. Because there are not many Korean people in town, Chloe and her best friend, Shelley, turn to internet blogs to learn things about Korean culture. Whenever Chloe makes traditional Korean food or wears traditional Korean clothes, her parents redirect the conversation or do not seem to know what she is talking about. Chloe nearly gives up on asking her parents about their past when the new Korean teacher at her school, Ms. Su-Hyung Lee, assigns her students to interview someone in their family about an old family story. Through persistence and hard work, Chloe finally convinces her parents to tell something about their past, but it is not what she expected. Instead of feeling like she finally knows who she is, Chloe feels more alone than ever. After finding out this new information about herself, Chloe learns more about what it really means to be who she is.

Themes

Racism & stereotyping 
Aimee Rogers of KidsReads.com stated that Chloe being "different" from everyone in her town, comes being treated differently. She further notes that while it seems like most of the citizens of Primrose Heights mean well, their stereotyping and racially inclined assumptions add up to blatant racism."Chloe's life teems with microaggressions: a hanbok she wears is called "exotic," strangers assume she is Chinese or Japanese, and a well-meaning orchestra teacher calls her "my Abigail Yang," a famous Korean violin virtuoso."  —Publishers Weekly

Reception 
Unidentified Suburban Object was reviewed by Common Sense Media, who rated it at four out of five stars with the summary, "Quirky take on identity is surprising and funny". The Bulletin of the Center for Children's Books also posted a review, stating that "While Chloe’s anger—about the subtle but constant racism, her parents’ vagueness, and the revelation that she isn’t even human—is believable, Chloe vents her feelings in ways erratic, unproductive, and alienating (no pun intended) that make it difficult to bond with her as a character." On the other hand, the Michigan Reading Journal admits "while some of Chloe’s concerns might seem trite and exaggerated to adult readers, her worries about how others see her will ring true to many adolescents."

Awards and honors

References 

2016 children's books
Scholastic Corporation books
American children's novels
Asian-American novels